The Somali dwarf shrew (Crocidura nana) is a species of mammal in the family Soricidae. It is found in Ethiopia and Somalia. Its natural habitat is subtropical or tropical dry lowland grassland.

Type Locality: Somalia, Dollo

References

Sources
 Don E. Wilson & DeeAnn M. Reeder (editors). 2005. Crocidura nana. Mammal Species of the World. A Taxonomic and Geographic Reference (3rd ed), Johns Hopkins University Press, 2,142 pp. (Available from Johns Hopkins University Press, 1-800-537-5487 or (410) 516-6900, or at http://www.press.jhu.edu).

Crocidura
Mammals described in 1890
Taxonomy articles created by Polbot